The Copa del Presidente de la República 1935 (President of the Republic's Cup) was the 35th staging of the Copa del Rey, the Spanish football cup competition.

The competition started in March 1935 and concluded on June 30, 1935, with the Final, held at the Estadio Chamartín in Madrid. Sevilla FC beat CE Sabadell for their first title in the competition.

First round

|}
Xerez SC received a bye.

Second round

|}

Third round

|}

Tiebreaker

|}

Fourth round

|}

Fifth round

|}

Tiebreaker

|}

Sixth round

|}

Round of 16

|}
Tiebreaker

|}

Quarter-finals

|}

Tiebreaker

|}

Semi-finals

|}

Final

References

External links
rsssf.com
 linguasport.com

1935
1935 domestic association football cups
1934–35 in Spanish football